The men's team pursuit race of the 2015–16 ISU Speed Skating World Cup 4, arranged in the Thialf arena in Heerenveen, Netherlands, was held on 11 December 2015.

The Dutch team won the race, with the Norwegian team in second place, and the Russian team in third.

Results
The race took place on Friday, 11 December, in the evening session, scheduled at 18:12.

References

Men team pursuit
4